The Hollywood Bowl Group is a company that runs the AMF Bowling & Hollywood Bowl branded multi lane ten-pin bowling and Puttstars brand minigolf centres in the UK.

The group is the largest operator of bowling alleys in Britain. HBG is a Member of the Tenpin Bowling Proprietors Association (TBPA) along with other bowling centre groups in the UK and has to adhere to the British Tenpin Bowling Association (BTBA) governing body’s guidelines.

History

Under AMF Bowling
The United States company AMF Bowling opened its first centre in the United Kingdom in Stamford Hill, North London on 20 January 1960. Between 1967 and 1970, AMF Bowling UK acquired its first 15 centres. After Goldman Sachs purchased AMF Bowling in 1996, the number of centres owned and operated by AMF Bowling in the UK rose in 1997 from 15 to 37. The company then embarked on a program to refurbish the acquired centres.

The AMF Bowling centres were found at Ashford, Gravesend, Stamford Hill and other locations.

In 2004 certain shareholders of the British leisure conglomerate, Bourne Leisure, acquired the AMF-branded centres in the UK. AMF Bowling UK then embarked on another programme of refurbishment and since 2007 had opened five new centres in the UK.

The Original Bowling Company  
In August 2010, AMF Bowling UK acquired the Hollywood Bowl business from Mitchells & Butlers PLC to become The Original Bowling Company Ltd (TOBC), UK’s largest bowling centre operator. TOBC then sold its "traditional" business to 1st Bowl, now known as MFA Bowl.

In September 2014, Electra Private Equity acquired TOBC for £91 million.

In 2015, TOBC purchased rival Bowlplex. TOBC itself then rebranded as Hollywood Bowl Group (HBG) after purchase of Bowlplex and phased out Bowlplex and most AMF branded centres, rebranded them as Hollywood Bowl – which was already its biggest brand of its three.

Puttstars and pandemic 
With phasing out of Bowlplex complete, Hollywood Bowl Group (HBG) started to develop a minigolf brand. HBG opened its first Puttstars but 20 days later, on 23 March 2020, the British Government imposed a lockdown across the UK causing all centres to shut.

Before bowling centres were able to open, it was announced that similar businesses (for example cinemas) could open but bowling alleys could not. HGB campaigned to be able to reopen at the same time as these businesses.

On 15 August 2020, Hollywood Bowl Group, along with other bowling centres and casinos, could reopen all its centres after over four and a half months of not being able to operate. Two planned Puttstars, also in August 2020, could open as their original opening dates were pushed back due to lockdown.

Rules to protect staff and customers had to be put in place to keep people inside of the centres from contracting COVID-19 from others in the centre who did not know they had it or those who were flouting rules by willingly bringing in the contagion.

Brands

Hollywood Bowl
Hollywood Bowl has a passion for bringing families and friends together for affordable fun and healthy competition, giving everyone who visits their centres that feel-good factor.

A typical visit includes bowling, food, drink, amusements and pool. All of their bowling centres are equipped with at least 14 lanes, a licensed bar, Hollywood Diner and an amusements zone with a variety of games.

AMF Bowling
AMF Bowling is a brand that was owned by a USA counterpart and is now a sub-brand of HBG. AMF Bowling brand has been phased out, its centres have been renovated to the Hollywood Bowl branding, the Worthing centre was the last uk AMF branded site and underwent a £500,000  makeover in early 2023.

Puttstars
Puttstars is the newest brand of the three. Hollywood Bowl Group opened its first minigolf centre at The Springs Retail Park, Leeds in March 2020.

On the 23rd that same month of opening, however, it had to be closed due to the COVID-19 pandemic due to measures put in place by the British Government. This pandemic also shuttered all of Hollywood Bowl Group’s other centres, with most only able to reopen after push backs on the 15th of August.

Two planned minigolf centres in York’s Community Stadium development (with adjacent Hollywood branded centre) and Rochdale were able to open for the first time with reopening of other sites.

Bowlplex Ltd was a bowling and leisure corporation that owned and operated 18 "total entertainment centres" across England, Wales and Scotland.

Centres
Bowlplex Centres were found at: Basingstoke, Birmingham, Blackburn, Braehead, Brighton, Bristol, Castleford, Dudley, Dunfermline, Nantgarw, Oxford, Poole/ Branksome, Tower Park, Portsmouth: Gunwharf Quays and Tunbridge Wells.

The final additions to the Bowlplex branding were in Cwmbran (Wales) and Camberley (Surrey). Both centres were operated with the new style of operations, with Brunswick Machinery lane machinery, scoring system and Meriq online bookings package. The stadium sports bar and Grill & Chill also had the addition of a new food and beverage operating system.

History
Millhaven Leisure was formed in 1976 to acquire the Branksome Bowl, as a Wessex Bowl. In 1984 that long-serving Managing Director Tracy Standish became involved with Bowlplex.

Over 25 years Bowlplex grew into a national group at 18 locations across the UK offering late-night licensed bars, dance floors, American pool. In a commercial deal with Sega Amusements Europe, Bowlplex had new arcade and gaming machines installed at all 18 centres. The Bowlplex unit at Yeovil was bought by 1st Bowl in 2012 and is now trading as a MFA Bowl.

In April 2015, the Original Bowling Company announced its intention to purchase Bowlplex, subject to approval by the Competition and Markets Authority. By late 2015 10 Bowlplex units were acquired by the company with most of the locations being rebranded under the "Hollywood Bowl" name. With competition concerns, six Bowlplex sites were sold to Tenpin Ltd in Bristol, Camberley, Castleford, Dudley, Glasgow and Nantgarw.

References

External links 
 Group website
 Commercial websites:
 Hollywood Bowl centres
 AMF centres
 Puttstars centres

Companies listed on the London Stock Exchange
Tenpin bowling in the United Kingdom